Laberinto is the twelfth studio album by Latin Grammy-winning Spanish musician and actor, Miguel Bosé, and his sixth with Warner Bros. Records (Warner Music Latina in the U.S.). It was released in 1995. Laberinto 2 is a Limited-Edition album, released in 1996.

Track listing for Laberinto

Track listing for Laberinto 2
 "Este Mundo Va"
 "Agua Clara"
 "Tesoro (Pudo Ser Tu Nombre...)"
 "No Encuentro Un Momento Pa' Olvidar"
 "Corazón Tocao"
 "Amor Entero"
 "Azul de Louïe"
 "Un Dia Después la Historia Sigue Igual"
 "Te Buscaré"
 "La Auto-Radio Canta"
 "¡Ay!"
 "Sequía"
 "Nunca Sabré"

Certifications and sales

References

1995 albums
1996 albums
Miguel Bosé albums
Warner Music Latina albums